The Rancho Santa Fe Open is a tournament for professional female tennis players played on outdoor hard courts. The event is classified as a $80,000 ITF Women's World Tennis Tour tournament and has been held in Rancho Santa Fe, California, United States, since 2011. From 2011 to 2020, the tournament was a $25,000 and held regularly in February. In 2021, the tournament was upgraded to $60,000 and moved to October.

Past finals

Singles

Doubles

External links 
 ITF search
 Official website

ITF Women's World Tennis Tour
Hard court tennis tournaments
Tennis tournaments in the United States
Tennis tournaments in California
2011 establishments in California
Women's sports in California